The 2020–21 Purdue Fort Wayne Mastodons men's basketball team represented Purdue University Fort Wayne in the 2020–21 NCAA Division I men's basketball season. The Mastodons, led by seventh-year head coach Jon Coffman, played their home games at the Hilliard Gates Sports Center in Fort Wayne, Indiana, as members of the Horizon League.

This was the Mastodons' first season in the Horizon League; the school left the Summit League after the 2019–20 season.

Previous season
The Mastodons finished the 2019–20 season 14–19 overall, 6–10 in Summit League play, to finish in 7th place. In the Summit League tournament, they defeated South Dakota State in the quarterfinals, before falling to North Dakota in the semifinals.

Offseason

Departures

Incoming transfers

Roster

Schedule and results

|-
!colspan=12 style=| Regular Season

|-
!colspan=12 style=| Horizon League tournament
|-

|-

Source

References

Purdue Fort Wayne Mastodons men's basketball seasons
Purdue Fort Wayne Mastodons
Purdue Fort Wayne Mastodons men's basketball
Purdue Fort Wayne Mastodons men's basketball